When the Gods Played a Badger Game is a 1915 American silent drama film directed by Joe De Grasse and written by Ida May Park, and featuring Pauline Bush and Lon Chaney. The film's working title was The Girl Who Couldn't Go Wrong.  The film is today considered lost.

Plot
Nan DeVere is a chorus girl who is romanced by Mr. Lany, a married man of considerable wealth. She agrees to marry him, but Mrs. Lany meets her at the theatre and begs her to stay away from her husband. She tells her of their former life of poverty, how he made a lucky mining strike, and then left her behind as he entered high society. Nan is moved by the woman's plea, and plans to teach the husband a good lesson with the help of Joe, the property man (Lon Chaney). She sends word to Mr. Lany that she will see him after the show.

The millionaire arrives at the theatre and takes her in his arms when suddenly Joe bursts in, pulling out a revolver and claiming to be Nan's husband. Mr. Lany, thinking he is the victim of a badger game, tells them that he is still in love with his wife, the only true-hearted woman in the world, and he leaves Nan's dressing room and goes back to be reunited with his wife.

Cast
 Pauline Bush as Nan DeVere, the chorus girl
 Lon Chaney as Joe, the property man
 T. D. Crittenden as Mr. Lany, the millionaire
 Florence Weil as Mr. Lany's wife
 Olive Carey (credited as Olive Golden) as Marie, a chorus girl

Reception
"Pauline Bush appears in this as a chorus girl. A married man pays her attention and at the wife's request she has the "prop" boy pretend to be her husband. The plot is quite pleasing and the behind-the-scenes settings are attractive." -- Moving Picture World

"A very strong offering made by Joseph De Grasse and a company headed by Pauline Bush and Lon Chaney, who plays the property man instead of his accustomed role of heavy. This is very well acted and constructed and will draw considerably on the sympathies of all."—Motion Picture News

References

External links

1915 films
1915 drama films
1915 lost films
1915 short films
American silent short films
American black-and-white films
Films directed by Joseph De Grasse
Universal Pictures short films
Silent American drama films
Lost American films
Lost drama films
1910s American films